The 2012–13 Luge World Cup was a multi race series over a season for luge. The season started on 24 November 2012 in Igls, Austria and ended on 24 February 2013 in Sochi, Russia. The World Cup was organised by the FIL and sponsored by Viessmann.

Calendar 
Below is the schedule for the 2012/13 season.

Results

Men's singles

Doubles

Women's singles

Team relay

Standings

Men's singles

Men's doubles

Women's singles

Team relay

See also
FIL World Luge Championships 2013

References

Luge World Cup
2012 in luge
2013 in luge